The Council of Bishops of the Serbian Orthodox Church, also known in English as the Holy Assembly of Bishops of the Serbian Orthodox Church  serves by Church constitution as the supreme body of the Serbian Orthodox Church. It is the supreme organ of the legislative authority of the Church in matters of faith, worship, church order or church discipline, and the internal organization of the Church. It is also the highest judicial authority in its jurisdiction. It is convened annually in May. In case of emergency, it can also be summoned at any other time.

The Bishops' Council consists of all diocesan bishops and the Patriarch, Porfirije, who serves as the chairman. Its decisions are recognized as valid if, at their adoption, more than half of the diocesan bishops are present at the meeting of the council. Only they can take part in voting on a particular issue. With an equal number of votes, the voice of the Patriarch is decisive.

Current members

See also 
 Serbian Orthodox Church#Structure
 Holy Synod of the Serbian Orthodox Church

Notes

References 

Serbian Orthodox Church
Governing assemblies of religious organizations